Prince Ezeakonobi Madumere (born 4 July 1964) is an entrepreneur, management consultant and administrator. He was sworn in as deputy governor after the impeachment of the former deputy governor Sir Jude Agbaso by the Imo House of Assembly. He also survived series of failed impeachment plots sponsored by his estranged friend and political associate, Owelle Rochas Okorocha.

Early life and education

Madumere was born in Port Harcourt, Rivers State with family roots in Mbaitoli, Imo State, Nigeria. He is the third among seven children of his parents HRH Eze Henry Anoruo Madumere and Ugoeze Malinda Madumere. He attended Primary and Secondary Education in, Owerri and Lagos state respectively after which he travelled to the United States of America where he studied management in San Jacinto College, Houston, Texas, and later on University of Houston and Texas Southern University to study business management and played American college football as outside linebacker for the University of Houston . He is a holder of master's degree in History and International Studies from Imo State University, while currently pursuing  his Doctorate Degree in History and International Studies also in Imo State University, Owerri, Imo State.

Business career
As a man of Calibre, Madumere worked as Area Manager of Channel Development in KFC and PepsiCo Inc in the United States for thirteen years, in order to explore the variety of flavors in the world.

As an American trained Management guru, he has brought his expertise to bear in both private and public sector. Prince Madumere worked with PepsiCo Inc. in the United States of America as an Area Manager, Channels Development Department where he traveled to over fifty countries expanding the business scope of the Multinational firm. He is a fellow of Nigeria Institute of Management, fellow of Nigeria Institute of Strategic Management and, fellow of Nigeria Institute of Administrators and also a fellow of African Business School.

As an entrepreneur, he has successfully managed businesses in Aviation, General Trading and also owned a chain of men beauty centers.

As Management and Administrative consultant, Madumere is a fellow to the following professional bodies: - Nigerian Institute of Management(NIM), Institute of Strategic Management, Nigeria, African Business School, Corporate Institute of Administrators, Nigeria etcetera.

Political career
During the 1998 gubernatorial elections in Nigeria, Madumere went back to Nigeria and served as director for Women and Youth Mobilization for Owelle Rochas Okorocha's campaign in Imo State under the Peoples Democratic Party (PDP). He also served as chief strategist on media and logistics for Okorocha's presidential bid under the ANPP in 2002–2003. He once worked in the presidency as the chief of staff to the presidential adviser on inter-party relations. On December 3, 2005, he ran for the Senate seat in Imo East Senatorial District (Owerri Zone) after it was declared vacant following the death of Senator Amah Iwuagwu. After the 2011 election, where Okorocha emerged victorious as the Governor of Imo State, Prince Ezeakonobi Madumere (MFR) was appointed the chief of staff to the Governor of Imo State, where he exhibited obstinate drive for excellence. He became deputy governor on 30 March 2013.

On the eve of 2011 Governorship election, Prince Eze Madumere's doggedness, fearlessness and obstinacy to defend Nigeria's Democracy was appreciably underscored, when was confined to an unjust detention for about a week at the Imo State Police Command Headquarters, Owerri for refusing to betray his boss and releasing whatever strategic information of the Rescue Mission Campaign Organization.

As if that was not enough, a kangaroo legal process was speedily initiated based on unfounded and laughable allegation that he led a group of undisclosed persons to throw sachet water at the convoy of former President Olusegun Obasanjo and the then Governor of Imo state, Chief Ikedi Ohakim. Thereafter, Prince Ezeakonobi was whisked to Owerri Prisons on awaiting trial for about a month at the time the Imo Rescue Mission was holding the grand finale rally in Owerri. It took the efforts of the Nigerian Civil Societies, their international counterparts and the Media to secure his release. It was appreciation of this sacrifice, to ensure that people's will was not scuttled, that the then President of Nigeria, Dr. Goodluck Jonathan was honoured with one of the highest National Honours Award, Member of the order of the Federal Republic (MFR). (ref: 'I have forgiven those who put me in jail on NAIJA247 NEWS By Babatunde Akinsola - Jul 17, 2014).

As the Deputy Governor of Imo State, his accomplishments are numerous especially in the area of Security, dispute and crisis management and resolution. His historic resolutions of disputes between host communities and oil exploration firms in the oil communities of Imo State are legendary. He has left a lasting legacy of harmonious relationship between the communities and their business guests. Among some of the cases were  Orsu Obodo community vs Addax Oil, Walter Smith Oil Exploration Vs Awarra Community, oil spillage crises between AGIP and Ohaji Egbema local government youths. He also brokered peace between Irete Community and Nigeria bottling company limited. Statutorily, as the Chairman of Imo State Boundary Commission, his knack for excellence in all facets of human endeavour also played out as he liaised with the former Deputy Governor of Abia State to nip in the bud what would have been a bloody skirmish bet seen Ihitte-Uboma and a community in Abia State. With an understanding between him and his Anambra State Deputy Governor colleague, effort is being made to resolve all boundary issues between Imo State and Anambra State as the affected communities have complied to conduct themselves in a peaceful manner. (ref; Nation: "Time to unveil Madumere February 11, 2018 in Politics). Also see the Nigerian Voice www.thenigerianvoice.com - Agip Oil Spillage: Imo government wades into Ohaji Egbema...)

Prince Ezeakonobi Madumere at present is handling majorly world Bank and International agencies in relation to development of the core sectors of Imo State.

For his avowed resolve  to always stand by the people, in 2018, he disagreed  with Governor Okorocha over irreconcilable issues that bordered on draconian policies that were both alien and inhuman in the history of governance. After much appeal for Okorocha to rescind his unpopular decisions, on February 25, 2018, he respectfully confronted his estranged boss on the salient issues and as they affected the people of the state. One of the critical issues on the front burner was Okorocha's affront to foist his son-in-law, Uche Nwosu, as he successor, which heated up the polity. Madumere fearlessly told his estranged boss he would not be party to what he described as their term through the back door. Madumere, for the first time, made public his stand on vexatious matters among which were demolition of business premises without first providing alternative, and where alternative markets were provided, it was freely shared to family members, friends and extended family members, leaving the poor to suffer and finding it difficult to feed. He also frowned at the poor quality jobs in the area of Road rehabilitation and construction as no known construction company was engaged, thereby giving room for the collapse of the roads during every rainy season. Madumere also described the recklessness in administering the state where civil servants were totally bundled out of their statutory functions, giving room for large scale corruption and financial impropriety. For these and more, Okorocha in connivance and collusion of the leadership of Imo lawmakers sponsored Madumere's impeachment with tax payers fund with the deputy speaker, Hon. Ugonna Ozuruigbo ingloriously moving a motion for the removal of Madumere from Office as the Deputy Governor of Imo State. See Punch, July 10, 2018(ref: I'm not an ex-convict, Madumere replies Imo lawmakers); (Punch, August 5, 2018: "Okorocha hired lawmakers to remove deputy – Ex- Justice commissioner),

After six failed attempts to remove Madumere from Office following the difficulty in finding any impeachable offence against him, on phoney claims, there was a seventh attempt, where Imo House of Assembly led by Acho Ihim purportedly claimed it removed Madumere from Office despite a subsisting Court Order by Imo High Court presided by Hon. Justice Ben. Iheka. Finally, on September 25, 2018, the court also presided by Iheka nullified the purported impeachment of Madumere as the Deputy Governor of Imo State, declaring it null and void and of no effect. Madumere's feat has drawn him to the heart of men and women of good conscience. ref: Channels Television, September 25, 2018: Court Nullifies Imo Deputy Governor's Impeachment). Also see Punch, Sept. 26: Jubilation as Court nullifies Imo Deputy Governor's impeachment etal...

'''Community Work/Charity

Prince Eze Madumere, a good family man who is happily married with children, is a member of Red Cross Society for many years. He has served as a two term chairman of the society in Imo State Branch where he contributed immensely as one of the financiers. He also donated two Ambulances to the Society. His avowed commitment to helping the wounded and victims of natural disaster, disputes and accidents is never in doubt. He was personally involved in the rescue operation during the flood incidents in the riverine areas of the state in 2015 and 2018 respectively. He has also led a team of Red Cross members at various occasions to rescue accident victims where they were evacuated to the government owned hospitals for treatment.

Again, in the area of community development, Madumere has consistently maintained an annual football competition for over 25 years in his mid twenties to engender unity and peace among the youths. This effort has led to the establishment of a football academy where talented youngsters are recruited for proper grooming and development. He is the first individual in Imo State of Nigeria to have hosted an Athletic championship in field and track events. He was also a backbone of Heartland FC of Owerri, Imo State where he invested time and money to save the club severally from relegation and at one time led them to victory.

His periodic visits to hospitals to look out for those who may not have money to pay for their treatments have also been applauded by the people. His periodic peace missions to communities that are having skirmishes have paid off as he has nipped in the bud what ordinarily would cause disputes of high magnitude.

References

External links

Living people
1964 births
Businesspeople from Port Harcourt
Igbo politicians
All Progressives Congress politicians